The 1998 First-Year Player Draft, Major League Baseball's annual amateur draft of high school and college baseball players, was held on June 2 and 3, 1998. A total of 1445 players were drafted over the course of 50 rounds.

First round selections

Supplemental first round selections

Compensation Picks

Other notable players
Gerald Laird, 2nd round, 45th overall by the Oakland Athletics
Adam Dunn, 2nd round, 50th overall by the Cincinnati Reds
Matt Belisle, 2nd round, 52nd overall by the Atlanta Braves
Brandon Inge, 2nd round, 57th overall by the Detroit Tigers
Jody Gerut, 2nd round, 71st overall by the Colorado Rockies
Barry Zito, 3rd round, 83rd overall by the Texas Rangers, but did not sign
Mike Maroth, 3rd round, 85th overall by the Boston Red Sox
Josh Fogg, 3rd round, 89th overall by the Chicago White Sox
Jason Michaels, 4th round, 104th overall by the Philadelphia Phillies
Eddy Furniss, 4th round, 118th overall by the Pittsburgh Pirates
Javier López, 4th round, 133rd overall by the Arizona Diamondbacks
Scott Proctor, 5th round, 156th overall by the Los Angeles Dodgers
Ryan Vogelsong, 5th round, 158th overall by the San Francisco Giants
Aubrey Huff, 5th round, 162nd overall by the Tampa Bay Devil Rays
Bill Hall, 6th round, 176th overall by the Milwaukee Brewers
Matt Holliday, 7th round, 210th overall by the Colorado Rockies
John Buck, 7th round, 212th overall by the Houston Astros
David Ross, 7th round, 216th overall by the Los Angeles Dodgers
Eric Byrnes, 8th round, 225th overall by the Oakland Athletics
Will Ohman, 8th round, 226th overall by the Chicago Cubs
Andrew Good, 8th round, 251st by the Arizona Diamondbacks
Joe Kennedy, 8th round, 252nd overall by the Tampa Bay Devil Rays
Ryan Madson, 9th round, 254th overall by the Philadelphia Phillies
Jack Wilson, 9th round, 258th overall by the St. Louis Cardinals
Mark Teixeira, 9th round, 265th overall by the Boston Red Sox, but did not sign
Morgan Ensberg, 9th round, 272nd overall by the Houston Astros
Juan Pierre, 13th round, 390th overall by the Colorado Rockies
Jay Gibbons, 14th round, 411th overall by the Toronto Blue Jays
Eric Hinske, 17th round, 496th overall by the Chicago Cubs
J. J. Putz, 17th round, 499th overall by the Minnesota Twins, but did not sign
B. J. Ryan, 17th round, 500th overall by the Cincinnati Reds
Brian Lawrence, 17th round, 502nd overall by the San Diego Padres
Ty Wigginton, 17th round, 514th overall by the New York Mets
Mike MacDougal, 17th round, 519th overall by the Baltimore Orioles, but did not sign
Joe Beimel, 18th round, 538th overall by the Pittsburgh Pirates
Adam LaRoche, 18th round, 550th overall by the Florida Marlins, but did not sign
Cliff Lee, 20th round, 609th overall by the Baltimore Orioles, but did not sign
Nick Punto, 21st round, 614th overall by the Philadelphia Phillies
Bobby Crosby, 34th round, 1021st overall by the Anaheim Angels, but did not sign
Mark Buehrle, 38th round, 1139th overall by the Chicago White Sox
Todd Coffey, 41st round, 1220th overall by the Cincinnati Reds
Nyjer Morgan, 42nd round, 1260th overall by the Colorado Rockies, but did not sign
Mike Jacobs, 48th round, 1413th overall by the Tampa Bay Devil Rays, but did not sign

NFL players drafted 
Chad Hutchinson, 2nd round, 48th overall by the St. Louis Cardinals
Drew Henson, 3rd round, 97th overall by the New York Yankees
Earnest Graham, 43rd round, 1273rd overall by the Philadelphia Phillies, but did not sign

See also
Major League Baseball
Major League Baseball Draft
List of MLB first overall draft choices
Rule 5 Draft

External links
Complete draft list from The Baseball Cube database
MLB.com's section on the draft

Major League Baseball draft
Draft
Major League Baseball draft